Tellapur is a satellite town of Hyderabad in Ramachandrapuram mandal of Sangareddy district in the Indian state of Telangana. The town is one of the fastest-growing locales in Hyderabad Metropolitan Region owing to its close proximity to IT hub and Outer Ring Road.

References

Sangareddy district